George M. Hearn, Jr. (born October 28, 1951) is an American lawyer and politician. From 2009 through 2013, he served as a member of the South Carolina House of Representatives from the 105th District, representing parts of Horry County, South Carolina. He lives in Conway, South Carolina where he owns his own law firm and is a member of the Republican party. Hearn did not seek reelection in 2012 in order to spend more time at home. His wife is South Carolina Supreme Court Justice Kaye G. Hearn.

References

Living people
1951 births
Republican Party members of the South Carolina House of Representatives